Berne Township is one of the thirteen townships of Fairfield County, Ohio, United States. As of the 2010 census the population was 5,088, of whom 4,662 lived in the unincorporated portions of the township.

Geography
Located in the southern part of the county, it borders the following townships:
Pleasant Township - north
Rush Creek Township - northeast
Marion Township, Hocking County - southeast
Good Hope Township, Hocking County - south
Madison Township - southwest
Hocking Township - west
Greenfield Township - northwest corner

Two municipalities are located in Berne Township: part of the city of Lancaster, the county seat of Fairfield County, in the northwest; and the village of Sugar Grove in the south.

Name and history
Berne Township was named after Bern (French: Berne), in Switzerland, the native home of a first settler. It is the only Berne Township statewide, although there is a Bern Township in Athens County.

Government
The township is governed by a three-member board of trustees, who are elected in November of odd-numbered years to a four-year term beginning on the following January 1. Two are elected in the year after the presidential election and one is elected in the year before it. There is also an elected township fiscal officer, who serves a four-year term beginning on April 1 of the year after the election, which is held in November of the year before the presidential election. Vacancies in the fiscal officership or on the board of trustees are filled by the remaining trustees.

References

External links
County website

Townships in Fairfield County, Ohio
Townships in Ohio